Franz Friedrich Kohl (13 January 1851, in St. Valentin auf der Haide – 15 December 1924, in Traismauer) was an Austrian entomologist and folksong researcher.
 
Kohl was initially a middle school professor in Bolzano and then Innsbruck. He next worked in the Entomology Department, Naturhistorisches Museum, Vienna. He specialised in Hymenoptera, especially Sphecidae. He is best known for his monograph Die Crabronen der paläarktischen Region monographisch bearbeitet. Ann. Hofmus. Wien. 29: 1-453 (1915).

References 
 Maidl, F. (1887 - 1951) 1925. [Kohl, F. F.] Ann. Naturhist. Mus. Wien 38 174-179 
 Musgrave, A. 1932. Bibliography of Australian Entomology 1775 - 1930. Sydney 180 
 Nonveiller, G. 1999. The Pioneers of the research on the Insects of Dalmatia. Zagreb, Hrvatski Pridodoslovni Muzej: 1-390 202

External links 
 
 German language
 Obituary (Pdf)
 Works on Sphecidae
 BMLO

1851 births
1924 deaths
19th-century Austrian people
20th-century Austrian people
Austrian entomologists
People from Amstetten District